Danylo Ryabenko (born 9 October 1998) is a Ukrainian professional footballer who plays for Mezőkövesdi SE.

Career statistics
.

References

 
 

1998 births
Living people
Ukrainian footballers
Ukrainian expatriate footballers
Association football goalkeepers
FC Lori players
CSKA Pamir Dushanbe players
Mezőkövesdi SE footballers
Nemzeti Bajnokság I players
Expatriate footballers in Armenia
Expatriate footballers in Tajikistan
Expatriate footballers in Hungary
Ukrainian expatriate sportspeople in Armenia
Ukrainian expatriate sportspeople in Tajikistan
Ukrainian expatriate sportspeople in Hungary
Sportspeople from Makiivka